André da Silva Lima (born 7 April 2000), simply known as André, is a Brazilian footballer who plays as a defensive midfielder for Mirassol.

Club career
He was promoted to the first team of the latter in 2020, and made his senior debut on 13 February of that year by coming on as a half-time substitute in a 1–0 home win against ABC, for the season's Copa do Nordeste.

On 18 April 2020, André renewed his loan deal until December 2021. He became an undisputed starter during the 2020 Série C, but had his loan terminated on 26 February 2021 due to interest from clubs in higher divisions; Santa Cruz retained 30% over a future sale.

On 6 March 2021, André agreed to a loan deal with Série A side Atlético Goianiense.

Career statistics

Honours
Atlético Goianiense
Campeonato Goiano: 2021

References

External links
Think Ball profile 

2000 births
Living people
Footballers from São Paulo
Brazilian footballers
Association football midfielders
Campeonato Brasileiro Série A players
Campeonato Brasileiro Série B players
Campeonato Brasileiro Série C players
Santa Cruz Futebol Clube players
Atlético Clube Goianiense players
Operário Ferroviário Esporte Clube players
Mirassol Futebol Clube players